The Saint Marks Avenue station was a station on the demolished section of the BMT Fifth Avenue Line in Brooklyn, New York City. Served by trains of the BMT Culver Line and BMT Fifth Avenue Line, it had 2 tracks and 2 side platforms. The station was opened on June 22, 1889 at Fifth Avenue and St. Marks Place, which is renamed St. Marks Avenue east of Fifth Avenue. It also had a connection to the Bergen Street Line trolleys. It closed on May 31, 1940.

References

BMT Fifth Avenue Line stations
Railway stations in the United States opened in 1889
Railway stations closed in 1940
1889 establishments in New York (state)
1940 disestablishments in New York (state)
Former elevated and subway stations in Brooklyn